Feliciano López won the previous year's edition, but decided not to participate in 2010.
Daniel Gimeno-Traver defeated Adrian Mannarino 6–4, 7–6(2) in the final.

Seeds

Draw

Finals

Top half

Bottom half

References
 Main Draw
 Qualifying Draw

Singles
2010